Yeh may refer to:

 Yeh, or Ye, a Chinese surname
 Yeh, an Arabic name of the letter Yodh
 Yeh College, a future residential college at Princeton University
 YEH, IATA code for Asalouyeh Airport, Iran

See also
 "Yeh, Yeh", a 1964 instrumental, later with lyrics added
 "Yeh Yeh Yeh", a 2003 song by British singer-songwriter Melanie C